Arsenidostanates are chemical compounds that contain anions with arsenic bonded to tin. They are in the category of tetrelarsenides, pnictidostancates, or tetrelpnictides.

They are distinct from arsenide stannides such as palarstanide, where the cation charge exceeds that on the tin or arsenic. Other minerals that contain arsenic and tin are erniggliite and coiraite.

References 

Arsenides
Tin compounds